Iulian Mamele (born 17 February 1985 in Bucharest, Romania) is a Romanian former footballer who played as a centre back.

Honours

Club
Pandurii
Liga I (1): runner-up 2013

External links
 
 Player's page at liga1.ro
 Player's page at lpf.ro
 

Footballers from Bucharest
1985 births
Living people
Romanian footballers
Association football defenders
CS Pandurii Târgu Jiu players
FC Viitorul Constanța players
CS Concordia Chiajna players
Liga I players